Scutachne is a genus of plants in the grass family. The only known species is Scutachne dura, native to Cuba, Jamaica, and Hispaniola (Haiti + Dominican Republic).

See also
Mayariochloa amphistemon, formerly Scutachne amphistemon

References

Panicoideae
Monotypic Poaceae genera
Taxa named by A. S. Hitchcock